Nicholas Mark Ahmed (born March 15, 1990) is an American professional baseball shortstop for the Arizona Diamondbacks of Major League Baseball (MLB).

Amateur career
Ahmed attended East Longmeadow High School in East Longmeadow, Massachusetts, where he played as a pitcher (posting a career record of 21–3), was a member of the National Honor Society, and also played basketball. He then enrolled at the University of Connecticut, where he majored in sport management and played shortstop and pitcher for the Connecticut Huskies baseball team. As a freshman, he batted .288 and .300 as a sophomore, and played for the Bourne Braves of the Cape Cod Baseball League during the summer of his 2010 sophomore year. As a junior, Ahmed hit .326.

Professional career

Atlanta Braves
The Atlanta Braves drafted Ahmed in the second round of the 2011 Major League Baseball draft, 85th overall. He played in minor league baseball for the Lynchburg Hillcats in 2012, and was named fastest baserunner in the league by Baseball America.

Arizona Diamondbacks
After the 2012 season, the Braves traded Ahmed, Martin Prado, Randall Delgado, Zeke Spruill, and Brandon Drury to the Diamondbacks for Justin Upton and Chris Johnson. Ahmed was called up to the major leagues for the first time on June 29, 2014. He collected his first Major League hit off of Odrisamer Despaigne. In 25 games, he hit an even .200 in 70 at bats.

Ahmed began the 2015 season as the Diamondbacks' starting shortstop. In 134 games, he hit .226 with nine home runs. Ahmed's 2016 season was cut short due to a right hip impingement, causing him to miss the last two months of the season. On June 27, 2017, his right hand was broken by a fastball, leading to a long layoff, and two months later his right wrist was fractured when he was hit by a pitch in a rehab appearance.

Ahmed entered the 2018 season fully healthy and went on to finish the season with career bests offensively. In 153 games, Ahmed hit .234 with 16 home runs, 70 RBIs and 33 doubles. He also had his best defensive season, leading National League shortstops with 21 defensive runs saved en route to his first career Gold Glove Award. The following season, Ahmed continued his offensive resurgence from 2018, hitting .254 with 19 home runs and 82 RBI while also netting his second straight Gold Glove Award. In the pandemic-shortened 2020 season, Ahmed hit .266 with five home runs and 29 RBIs in 57 games.

In 2021, Ahmed appeared in 129 games for the Diamondbacks, posting a slash of .221/.280/.339 with 5 home runs, 38 RBI, and 7 stolen bases. Ahmed played in 17 games for Arizona in 2022, slashing .231/.259/.442 with 3 home runs and 7 RBI. On June 8, 2022, he was placed on the 60-day injured list with right shoulder inflammation.

Personal life
Ahmed is married to Amanda Ahmed. They have two sons. Ahmed is a Christian.

Ahmed has a younger brother, Michael, who played college baseball for the Holy Cross Crusaders and was selected in the 20th round (604th overall) of the 2013 Major League Baseball Draft by the Los Angeles Dodgers. His uncle, Raphael Cerrato, is the head baseball coach at the University of Rhode Island.

References

External links

1990 births
Living people
Arizona Diamondbacks players
UConn Huskies baseball players
Bourne Braves players
Danville Braves players
Lynchburg Hillcats players
Phoenix Desert Dogs players
Mobile BayBears players
Salt River Rafters players
Reno Aces players
Baseball players from Massachusetts
People from East Longmeadow, Massachusetts
Gold Glove Award winners
Major League Baseball shortstops